Toghan (also Romanized as Ţoghān; also known as Ţowqān) is a village in Karipey Rural District, Lalehabad District, Babol County, Mazandaran Province, Iran. At the 2006 census, its population was 556, in 136 families.

References 

Populated places in Babol County